Nikita Dutta (born 13 November 1993) is an Indian actress who appears in Hindi films and Hindi television. As a finalist of Femina Miss India 2012, she made her acting and film debut with Lekar Hum Deewana Dil where she played a supporting role. Dutta then made her television debut with the show Dream Girl and is best known for her portrayal of Suman Tiwari in Ek Duje Ke Vaaste. 

She returned to films in 2018 with Gold, and after a supporting appearance in Kabir Singh (2019), has since headlined the financial thriller The Big Bull (2021) and the horror drama Dybbuk (2021).

Early life
Nikita Dutta was born on 13 November 1993. As her father is a naval officer in the Indian Navy, she has spent most of her life living in Visakhapatnam and Mumbai. She completed her schooling from Mumbai. She is a graduate of Economics from St. Xavier's College, Mumbai.

Career

Femina and Bollywood debut (2012-2014)
Dutta participated in the 2012 edition of Femina Miss India and landed up as one of the finalists. Later, she made her silverscreen debut with a brief role in the romantic comedy Lekar Hum Deewana Dil (2014). Produced by Saif Ali Khan, the film failed to perform well at the box office.

Television debut and success (2015-2018)
Dutta made her television debut in 2015 with Life OK's drama series Dream GirlEk Ladki Deewani Si. She starred alongside Shraddha Arya and Mohsin Khan, portraying Lakshmi Mathur, an aspiring actress who falls in love with Khan's character. She quit the show in November 2015.

In 2016, Dutta was cast in Sony Entertainment Television's Ek Duje Ke Vaaste opposite Namik Paul. The show culminated in October the same year.

Dutta's next television show the romantic thriller Haasil–which aired for 4 months (October 2017 to February 2018). Cast opposite Zayed Khan and Vatsal Sheth, she played Aanchal Srivastava, a lawyer who dares up against a rich family, the Raichands, and engages in a love triangle with the family's two step-brothers.

Film comeback and further career (2018-present)
Dutta returned to films in 2018 with Gold, a sports film written and directed by Reema Kagti and based upon the national hockey team's title at the 1948 Summer Olympics. Co-starring with Akshay Kumar, Mouni Roy, and Sunny Kaushal, she played the supporting role of Kaushal's girlfriend. She also appeared in Netflix's Lust Stories as the male protagonist's fiancé in a segment written and directed by Kagti's friend Zoya Akhtar.

In 2019, Dutta made her web debut with MX Player's original series Aafat, playing the role of Titli, a divorcee. The same year, she starred as a film actress Jia Sharma in Sandeep Vanga's action romantic drama Kabir Singh, an adaptation of Vanga's Telugu romance Arjun Reddy (2017) and co-starring Shahid Kapoor and Kiara Advani. Kabir Singh received mixed reviews from critics but proved one of the highest-grossing Indian films of all time, grossing more than  worldwide. Dutta received praise for her chemistry with Kapoor in the second half, and followed up the success of Kabir Singh with a central role in Neeraj Udhwani's Maska, a drama about an aspiring actor who is caught between his own dream and his mother's ambitions of seeing him take over the family Irani cafe.

In 2021, Dutta starred opposite Abhishek Bachchan in Kookie V. Gulati's The Big Bull, a fictionalized biographical film about 1992 stock market scam accused broker Harshad Mehta, playing Priya Patel Shah. Her next film, Dybbuk, was released the same year on Amazon Prime Video, starring her opposite Emraan Hashmi in a remake of writer-director Jay Krishnan's own debut film, the 2017 Malayalam horror drama Ezra.

Dutta is slated to star opposite Aditya Seal in the Zee Studios dance musical drama Rocket Gang, which is to mark the directorial debut of choreographer Bosco Martis.

Filmography

Films

Television

Web series

Music videos

Awards and nominations

References

External links

Indian women television presenters
Indian television presenters
Living people
People from Delhi
Actresses in Hindi cinema
Indian film actresses
Indian television actresses
Indian soap opera actresses
1990 births
21st-century Indian actresses
Actresses from Mumbai